(born 5 January 1952 in Nakagusuku, Okinawa) is an Okinawan musician. He has released two albums and is known in the United States particularly for his collaborations with Bob Brozman. He was also a member of Champloose.

Discography

Albums
 Jin Jin/Firefly CD (2000)
 Nankuru Naisa CD (2001)

Contributing artist
 The Rough Guide to the Music of Japan CD (1999, World Music Network)
 Putumayo Kids Presents: Asian Dreamland CD (2006)
 Rough Guide To Japan CD (2008)

References

External links
 Official website 

Japanese male musicians
Japanese male singers
Living people
Musicians from Okinawa Prefecture
People from Okinawa Prefecture
1952 births